The 1998 Las Vegas 500K was the eleventh and final round of the 1998 Indy Racing League. The race was held on October 11, 1998 at the  Las Vegas Motor Speedway in Las Vegas, Nevada.

Report

Qualifying

Two laps qualifying. The worst lap from any of the drivers are unknown.

  Couldn't qualify due to an unscheduled engine change. He was allowed to start the race at the back of the field.
  Waved off his qualifying attempt after two warm-up laps. He was allowed to start the race at the back of the field.

Race

Race Statistics
Lead changes: 13 among 7 drivers

Standings after the race

Drivers' Championship standings

 Note: Only the top five positions are included for the standings.

References

External links
IndyCar official website

1998 in IndyCar
1998 in sports in Nevada
Las Vegas 500K 1998
Las Vegas 500K 1998